Kalnik or Kalničko gorje is a mountain in northwestern Croatia.

References

External links
 http://www.tz.kalnik.hr/

Mountains of Croatia
Landforms of Koprivnica-Križevci County